The 2016–17 Hannover 96 season is the first since being relegated from the Bundesliga.

Background
Hannover were relegated from the Bundesliga. They had been in the Bundesliga for 14 seasons. This was the fifth time they were relegated from the Bundesliga. Hannover 96 are looking for a new coach. During the 2015–16 season, Michael Frontzeck resigned and Thomas Schaaf was sacked. Daniel Stendel took over for the rest of 2015–16 season as interim head coach and was eventually given the permanent job.

Florian Hübner and Sebastian Maier joined Hannover. Marcelo transferred to Beşiktaş after playing there on loan for the previous half year. Ron-Robert Zieler left the club.

Players

Out on loan

Transfers

In

Out

Friendlies

2. Bundesliga

Review
Hannover started the season on 5 August 2016 against 1. FC Kaiserslautern. Hannover won the match 4–0. Hannover then defeated Greuther Fürth 3–1. The first season loss came on the 4th matchday in a home match against Dynamo Dresden, which they lost 0–2. They recovered with three wins from the next four matches, only to lose two matches in a row against Union Berlin and 1. FC Nürnberg, respectively. From there on until the winter break they remained unbeaten, with four wins and three draws, causing them to spend the break in second place. They started the second half of the season with a 1–0 home win against Kaiserslautern, thereby moving up to first place for the first time since the second matchday.

On 20 March 2017, after only one win in the previous four matches, Hannover 96 sacked coach Daniel Stendel and appointed André Breitenreiter as new head coach.

League table

Results summary

Results by round

League fixtures and results

DFB-Pokal

DFB-Pokal review
In the first round draw, Hannover were drawn against Kickers Offenbach, beating them 3–2 after extra time by means of a last-minute penalty goal by Salif Sané. They went on to face Fortuna Düsseldorf in the second round, beating them 6–1, their highest season win. For the round of 16, they were drawn against Bundesliga side Eintracht Frankfurt, against who they lost 1–2 after initially taking the lead and were thereby eliminated.

DFB-Pokal fixtures and results

Statistics

Appearances and goals

|-
! colspan=14 style=background:#dcdcdc; text-align:center| Goalkeepers

|-
! colspan=14 style=background:#dcdcdc; text-align:center| Defenders

|-
! colspan=14 style=background:#dcdcdc; text-align:center| Midfielders

|-
! colspan=14 style=background:#dcdcdc; text-align:center| Forwards

|-
! colspan=14 style=background:#dcdcdc; text-align:center| Players transferred out during the season

|}

Goalscorers

Last updated: 21 May 2017

Clean sheets

Last updated: 14 May 2017

Disciplinary record

Last updated: 21 May 2017

References

Hannover 96 seasons
Hannover 96